Jen Stills is a singer and songwriter who was raised in Arizona and later moved to Los Angeles where she lives today. She is the daughter of the American rock musician Stephen Stills.

Stills has appeared on Ray LaMontagne's album Trouble on the track “Narrow Escape,” and on the title track of Crosby Stills and Nash's After the Storm. She toured Europe in 2008 appearing with Rufus Wainwright's band and is working and writing in Nashville.

Her song "Good Intentions" was included on the soundtrack for the film The Prince and Me.

Discography
"These Days" (AO Recordings, 2009)

Soundtrack
 Brothers & Sisters episode "A Valued Family" (2010) - with "Love the One You're With" as performer
 Brothers & Sisters episode "Nearlyweds" (2009) - with "These Days" as performer
 The Prince and Me (2004) - with "Good Intentions"

References

External links
last.fm
Official Jen Stills website
AO Recordings
[ All Music]

Year of birth missing (living people)
Living people
American singer-songwriters